Robinsonia boliviana is a moth in the family Erebidae. It was described by Adalbert Seitz in 1921. It is found in French Guiana, Peru and Bolivia.

References

Moths described in 1921
Robinsonia (moth)